Quamvis ad amplianda is a papal bull issued by Pope Alexander VI on 1 June 1500 calling for a crusade against the Ottoman Empire in response to Ottoman invasions of Venetian territories in Greece. After requests for funds and military support from the German Reichstag were rejected, a universal tithe was instituted with the bull.

References

Sources

16th-century papal bulls
Documents of Pope Alexander VI